The topological censorship theorem (if valid) states that general relativity does not allow an observer to probe the topology of spacetime: any topological structure collapses too quickly to allow light to traverse it. More precisely, in a globally hyperbolic, asymptotically flat spacetime satisfying the null energy condition, every causal curve from past null infinity to future null infinity is fixed-endpoint homotopic to a curve in a topologically trivial neighbourhood of infinity.

A 2013 paper by Sergey Krasnikov claims that the topological censorship theorem was not proven in the original article because of a gap in the proof.

References

Lorentzian manifolds